Governor Morrill may refer to:

Anson Morrill (1803–1887), 24th Governor of Maine
Edmund Needham Morrill (1834–1909), 13th Governor of Kansas
Lot M. Morrill (1813–1883), 28th Governor of Maine
David L. Morril (1772–1849), 10th Governor of New Hampshire